Kersten Artus  (née Westphal, born April 1, 1964) is a German journalist and politician. She is a member of The Left and a member of the Hamburg Parliament.

Life 
Kersten Artus was born in Bremen. She moved to Hamburg in 1982 and worked as a Merchant and Documentalist. In 1998 she became editor in Bauer Media Group. Since 1893 she is a member of Works councils within the Bauer Media Group and chairwoman since 1994. She is member of Vereinte Dienstleistungsgewerkschaft.

Karsten Artus started her political career in the German Schülerbewegung (pupil's movement) in Bremen and in the Peace movement. She was a member of the Socialist German Workers Youth and a member of the German Communist Party from 1983 to 1989. In the 1990. she was a member of the Party of Democratic Socialism for two years. She became a member of The Left. In the Hamburg state election 2008 she was elected to the Hamburg Parliament.

References

External links

 Kersten Artus' website (German)
 Kersten Artus on Hamburg Parliament's website (German)

1964 births
Living people
Politicians from Bremen
German Communist Party politicians
Party of Democratic Socialism (Germany) politicians
The Left (Germany) politicians
21st-century German politicians
Members of the Hamburg Parliament
German journalists